Olaf Sandner (24 July 1923 – 20 November 2013) was a Venezuelan épée and sabre fencer. He competed in three events at the 1952 Summer Olympics.

References

External links
 

1923 births
2013 deaths
Venezuelan male épée fencers
Olympic fencers of Venezuela
Fencers at the 1952 Summer Olympics
Venezuelan male sabre fencers